"Woman Like a Man" is a single by Damien Rice, released in 2003. The track "Woman Like a Man" is not released on any regular album, however it appears as a third unlisted hidden track of the iTunes "O" album's Eskimo track and as a live version on the 2004 compilation album B-Sides.

Track listing
 "Woman Like a Man" - 4:47
 "Delicate" - 5:12
 "Lonelily" - 3:15
 "The Professor" (live) - 5:07

References

Damien Rice songs
2003 singles
Songs written by Damien Rice
2003 songs